The following lists events that happened during 1803 in Australia.

Incumbents
Monarch - George III

Governors
Governors of the Australian colonies:
Governor of New South Wales – Captain Philip King

Events
 14 January – Lieut-Col David Collins commissioned in England to found a new settlement on Bass Strait, preferably at Port Phillip.
 5 March – George Howe publishes the first issue of the weekly The Sydney Gazette and The New South Wales Advertiser, Australia's first newspaper.
 19 April - Governor King proclaims toleration for Catholics and allows Fr James Dixon to say mass for Irish convicts.
 14 May - Illegal Masonic meeting held in Sydney and all participants arrested.
 25 November  - William James Hobart Thorne Born in (25 November 1803) Becoming the First white child born in Victoria – 2 July 1872) was born at Port Phillip, in what was still part of New South Wales but became Victoria. 
 27 December  – Convict William Buckley escapes from Sullivan Bay, Victoria. He lives with the Wautharong Aboriginal people for 32 years.
 26 June – John Macarthur writes the Statement of Improvement and Progression of Fine Woolled Sheep in New South Wales.

Exploration and settlement
 January–February – Acting Lieutenant Charles Robbins and NSW Surveyor General Charles Grimes survey Port Phillip in 
 2 February – Charles Grimes discovered the Yarra River.
 9 June –  arrives in Port Jackson after circumnavigating Australia.  On the voyage Matthew Flinders charted the coast and Robert Brown made an extensive collection of the flora of Australia.
 11 September – John Bowen with a party of forty-eight found the first settlement in Van Diemen's Land near the Derwent River.

Births
1 January – Daniel Egan, politician (died 1870)

Deaths
 26 August – Joseph Luker, police officer (born )
 16 September – Nicholas Baudin, French explorer (born 1754)
 17 November – William Balmain, First Fleet surgeon (born 1762)

References

 
Australia
Years of the 19th century in Australia